Gizałki  is a village in Pleszew County, Greater Poland Voivodeship, in west-central Poland. It is the seat of the gmina (administrative district) called Gmina Gizałki.

The village has a population of 583.

References

Villages in Pleszew County